Hurdling may refer to:

Hurdle, a portable woven fence, usually made of willow
Hurdling, athletics
Hurdling (horse race)